Uttarakhand Lokayukta is the Parliamentary Ombudsman for the state of Uttarakhand in India. It is a high level statutory functionary, created to address grievances of the public against ministers, legislators, administration and public servants of the state, in issues related to misuse of power, mal-administration and corruption. It was first formed under the Uttarakhand Lokayukta Act, 2014 and approved by the Governor of Uttarakhand. The passage of Lokpal and Lokayuktas Act, 2013 in Parliament of India had become law from January 16, 2014, and requires each state to appoint its Lokayukta within a year. and assists him in his work and acts in-charge Lokayukta in case the position fells vacant before time.

Powers 

Uttarakhand Lokayukta has complete and exclusive authority for enquiring into allegations or complaints against the Chief Minister of Uttarakhand, Deputy Chief Minister of Uttarakhand, Uttarakhand ministers, Uttarakhand Leader of the Opposition and Uttarakhand government officials. Lokayukta Act of the state which serves as its tool against corruption covers Chief Ministers, ex-Chief Ministers, State government officials, State ministers, IAS officers and, all public servants. Uttarakhand Lokayukta has powers to enquire into corruption allegations and related matters against State government officials, State public servants and elected officials in the state government.

List of Uttarakhand Lokayuktas

See also
 Lokayukta
 Lokpal
 The Lokpal and Lokayuktas Act, 2013
 Uttarakhand Lok Adalat
 Uttarakhand High Court
 Chief Justice of Uttarakhand

References 

Lokayuktas
Uttarakhand